Ivan Moscovich is a designer and commercial developer of puzzles, games, toys, and educational aids. He has written many books and is internationally recognized in the toys industry as an innovative inventor.

Biography
Ivan Moscovich was born to Jewish Hungarian parents on 14 June 1926 in Novi Sad in the Yugoslav province of Vojvodina. His father was a Hungarian who escaped into Yugoslavia after World War I. Moscovich's father was a professional painter but opened a photographic studio which he named Photo Ivan after his son.  He is often noted as being an industrial designer.  Moscovich had a sheltered, middle class childhood.

In 1941, Yugoslavia surrendered unconditionally to the Axis powers during World War II.  Hungary occupied Vojvodina.  In January 1942, Moscovich's father was a victim of the Novi Sad massacre. His father died at age 44.  In 1943, Hungary started secret armistice negotiations with the Allied Powers which was discovered by Germany resulting in the German occupation of Vojvodina. Soon after, at the age of 17, Moscovich was taken to the concentration camp at Auschwitz with his grandfather, grandmother and mother.  His grandparents were immediately taken to the crematoria and were killed.  While his mother stayed in Auschwitz, Moscovich was moved to Wustegiersdorf, one of the surrounding work camps, laying rail lines.  In January 1945, Auschwitz was evacuated and Moscovich along with 60,000 prisoners marched west to Bergen-Belsen.  After only a few days, Moscovich volunteered for a selection of 500 volunteer prisoner workers.  
These volunteers were sent to clear the railway station in Hildesheim by dislodging the wagons to free the rails so they could be fixed and used for German transports.  While there, several groups found food supplies including sugar, butter, and eggs.  On 22 March Hildesheim was bombed, killing or wounding both prisoners and German guards. The volunteers were made to move the bodies for easier identification.  They were then marched to the Hannover-Ahlem prison camp. The prisoners worked in an asbestos mine converting it into an ammunition depot safe from aerial attacks.  Hannover-Ahlem was evacuated on 6 April 1945 and Moscovich marched towards Bergen-Belsen again.  Moscovich describes the last days in Bergen-Belsen as “the ultimate in human misery, suffering, degradation, death and humiliation.”  He hid himself among a pile of dead bodies to avoid the Germans.

British soldiers liberated Bergen Bergen Belsen on 15 April 1945. Moscovich, who had endured 4 concentration camps and 2 forced work camps, was sent to Sweden for recuperation before returning home.  There he meets his mother who was liberated from Mauthausen by US troops.

Life After World War 2 (1945-1952)

Moscovich got his first job in Yugoslavia.  A friend in Tito’s Ministry of Transport offered him a position repairing Yugoslavia’s railway system which had been damaged during the war.  The position required a large, untested German machine using high electrical wattage to weld rail lines.  By 1947, Moscovich reported directly to the deputy minister.

Moscovich was given control over a squad of 50 German prisoners of war including some high ranking German officers, some regular soldiers, some Wehrmacht, and some SS.  Although he considered taking his revenge, Moscovich elected to increase their rations in order to increase their productivity.  However, he never told them he was a camp survivor.  After 6 months, Tito released the workers.

During the time he worked the position, he received a medal from Tito himself.

After finishing his university studies in mechanical engineering at the University of Belgrade, he emigrated to Israel, where he initially  worked as a research scientist involved in the design of teaching materials, educational aids, and educational games.

Publications

References

External links
 Master of Mysteries (a Popular Science article)
  (a "Chicago Toy and Game" article)
  (a Big Think article)
  Book by Moscovich

Living people
Yugoslav people of Hungarian descent
Toy designers
1926 births